This article describes the 1957-born Korean director; for the 1983-born director of the same name, see After My Death by Kim Ui-seok (director, born 1983) (also spelled Kim Uiseok).

Kim Ui-seok (born 6 July 1957) is a South Korean film director. He has directed six films since 1992. His film Cheongpung myeongwol was screened in the Un Certain Regard section at the 2004 Cannes Film Festival.

Filmography
 Gyeolhon iyagi (1992)
 Geu yeoja, geu namja (1993)
 Chongjabi (1995)
 Holiday in Seoul (1997)
 Bukkyeong banjeom (1999)
 Cheongpung myeongwol (2003)

References

External links

1957 births
Living people
South Korean film directors